Ravno Bučje may refer to:

 Ravno Bučje (Bujanovac), a village in southern Serbia
 Ravno Bučje (Knjaževac), a village in southern Serbia